The Catskill Mountains, also known as the Catskills, are a physiographic province of the larger Appalachian Mountains, located in southeastern New York.  As a cultural and geographic region, the Catskills are generally defined as those areas close to or within the borders of the Catskill Park, a  forest preserve protected from many forms of development under New York state law.

Geologically, the Catskills are a mature dissected plateau, a flat region subsequently uplifted and eroded into sharp relief by watercourses. The Catskills form the northeastern end of the Allegheny Plateau (also known as the Appalachian Plateau).  

The Catskills were named by early Dutch settlers. They are well known in American society as the setting for films and works of art, including many 19th-century Hudson River School paintings, as well as for being a favored destination for vacationers from New York City in the mid-20th century. The region's many large resorts gave many young stand-up comedians an opportunity to hone their craft. Since the late 19th century, the Catskills have been a haven for artists, musicians and writers, especially in and around the towns of Woodstock and Phoenicia.

History

Etymology 

While the meaning of the name ("cat creek [kill]" in Dutch) and the namer (early Dutch explorers) are settled matters, how and why the area is named "Catskills" is a mystery. Mountain lions (catamounts) were known to have been in the area when the Dutch arrived in the 17th century and may have been a reason for the name.

The confusion over the origins of the name led over the years to variant spellings such as Kaatskill and Kaaterskill, both of which are also still used: the former in the regional magazine Kaatskill Life, the latter as the name of a mountain peak and a waterfall. The supposed Native American name for the range, Onteora ("land in the sky"), was actually created by a white man in the mid-19th century to drum up business for a resort. It, too, persists today as the name of a school district and as the name of a Boy Scout summer camp (Onteora Scout Reservation).

Geography
The Catskills occupy much of two counties (Greene and Ulster), and extend slightly into Delaware, Sullivan, and southwestern Schoharie counties.

At the range's eastern end, the mountains begin dramatically with the Catskill Escarpment rising up suddenly from the Hudson Valley. The western boundary is far less certain, as the mountains gradually decline in height and grade into the rest of the Allegheny Plateau, but maps from the 18th and 19th centuries consistently mark the border of the Catskill Mountains as the East Branch of the Delaware River, which is consistent with the actual topographic relief. The Pocono Mountains, to the immediate southwest in Pennsylvania, are also a part of the Allegheny Plateau. 

The Catskills contain more than 30 peaks above  and parts of six important rivers.

Climatically, the Catskills lie within the Allegheny Highlands forests ecoregion.

Climate

According to the Köppen climate classification system, the Catskill Mountains have two climate zones. The vast majority of the Catskills have a warm summer humid continental climate (Dfb) with some isolated locations in valleys with hot summer humid continental climate (Dfa).

Geology

Although the Catskills are sometimes compared with the Adirondack Mountains farther north, the two mountain ranges are not geologically related, as the Adirondacks are a continuation of the Canadian Shield.  Similarly, the Shawangunk Ridge, which forms the southeastern edge of the Catskills, is part of the geologically distinct Ridge-and-Valley province and is a continuation of the same ridge known as Kittatinny Mountain in New Jersey and Blue Mountain in Pennsylvania.

The Catskill Mountains are more of a dissected plateau than a series of mountain ranges. The sediments that make up the rocks in the Catskills were deposited when the ancient Acadian Mountains in the east were rising and subsequently eroding. The sediments traveled westward and formed a great delta into the sea that was in the area at that time. The escarpment of the Catskill Mountains is near the former (landward) edge of this delta, as the sediments deposited in the northeastern areas along the escarpment were deposited above sea level by moving rivers, and the Acadian Mountains were located roughly where the Taconic Mountains are located today (though significantly larger). Finer sediment was deposited further westward, and thus the rocks change from gravel conglomerates to sandstone and shale. Further west, these fresh water deposits intermingle with shallow marine sandstone and shale until the end, in deeper water limestone.

The uplift and erosion of the Acadian Mountains was occurring during the Devonian and early Mississippian period (395 to 325 million years ago). Over that time, thousands of feet of these sediments built up, slowly moving the Devonian seashore further west. A meteor impact occurred in the shallow sea approximately 375 mya, creating a  diameter crater. This crater eventually filled with sediments and became Panther Mountain through the process of uplift and erosion. By the middle of the Mississippian period, the uplift stopped, and the Acadian Mountains had been eroded so much that sediments no longer flowed across the Catskill Delta.

Over time, the sediments were buried by more sediments from other areas, until the original Devonian and Mississippian sediments were deeply buried and slowly became solid rock. Then the entire area experienced uplift, which caused the sedimentary rocks to begin to erode. Today, those upper sedimentary rocks have been completely removed, exposing the Devonian and Mississippian rocks. Today's Catskills are a result of the continued erosion of these rocks, both by streams and, in the recent past, by glaciers.

In successive ice ages, both valley and continental glaciers have widened the valleys and the notches of the Catskills and rounded the mountains. Grooves and scratches in exposed bedrock provide evidence of the great sheets of ice that once traversed the region. Even today the erosion of the mountains continues, with the region's rivers and streams deepening and widening the mountains' valleys and cloves.

Recreation

The Borscht Belt
In the mid–20th century, summer resorts in the Catskills, nicknamed the Borscht Belt, were a major vacation destination for Jewish New Yorkers. At its peak of popularity, about 500 resorts operated in the region. Later changes in vacationing patterns have led most of those travelers elsewhere, although there are still some bungalow communities and summer camps in the region catering to Orthodox populations.

Aquatic sports and recreation

Esopus Creek is a  tributary of the Hudson River, starting at Winnisook Lake on Slide Mountain. It flows across Ulster County to the Hudson River at Saugerties. The Esopus is noted for making an almost 270-degree turn around Panther Mountain, following a buried  impact crater rim. It is famous for tubing, a sport of rafting down a river in an inner tube.  Many tubers begin their trip at Phoenicia, New York, and head down the creek towards the Ashokan Reservoir at Olive, New York.

The Ashokan Reservoir is part of the New York City water supply system, with fishing allowed under permit, but swimming and most other recreational uses are forbidden.

River canoeing and kayaking are popular. There are 42 rapids ranging from class I to V+.

The Esopus Creek is famous for its fly fishing, although in recent years it has been plagued by invasive plants.

Cycling
Road and mountain bicycling are fairly popular in the range. Bicycle racing includes the Tour of the Catskills, a three-day road stage race held in Green and Ulster counties each summer, and the UCI Mountain Bike World Cup in Windham. Other cycling resources include the Catskill Scenic Trail, the Headwaters Trails in Stamford and the Roundtopia trail network (mapped by the Round Top Mountain Bike Association). Several ski centers provide downhill mountain bicycling in the warmer months.

Hiking and camping
Catskill Park is part of New York's Forest Preserve. Not all the land is publicly owned; about 60% remains in private hands, but new sections are added frequently. Most of the park and the preserve are within Ulster County, with a significant portion in Greene County, and parts in Sullivan and Delaware counties as well. Many of the trails in public areas are maintained and updated by the New York–New Jersey Trail Conference and the Catskill Mountain 3500 Club. Devil's Path is one of the many trails open for hikers. Spots to camp in the Catskills include Bear Spring Mountain, Little Pond, Mongaup Pond, and North-South Lake.

Skiing

There are five main downhill ski and snowboard areas in the Catskills: Belleayre Mountain (run by the Olympic Regional Development Authority); Hunter Mountain (the first ski area to install snowmaking machines in New York); Windham Mountain; Holiday Mountain Ski and Fun in Monticello; and Plattekill Mountain in Roxbury.

Joppenbergh Mountain, in Rosendale Village hosted its first ski jumping competition in 1937.  Ski jumping was continued on the mountain until February 7, 1971, when the last competition was held.

The Mountain Trails Cross Country Ski Center in Tannersville has  of trails.

Structures

Fire towers

The Catskill Mountains fire towers were constructed to facilitate forest fire prevention and control. Twenty-three fire towers were built in the Catskill Mountains between 1908 and 1950. The fire towers fell out of use by the 1970s as fire spotting from airplanes had become more effective and efficient, so the fire towers were decommissioned; the Hunter Mountain Fire Tower was the last to be taken out of service in 1990. All but six of the towers were dismantled. The five remaining towers have been renovated and opened to the public as observation posts with panoramic views and a sixth tower was opened at the Catskill Visitor Center in 2022. The current towers are:

Balsam Lake Mountain Fire Observation Station near Hardenburgh, elevation 
Hunter Mountain Fire Tower near Hunter, elevation 
Mt. Utsayantha Fire Tower near Stamford, New York, elevation 
Overlook Mountain Tower near Woodstock, elevation 
Red Hill Fire Observation Station near Denning, elevation 
Mount Tremper Fire Observation Station near Shandaken, elevation 
Upper Esopus Fire Observation Station near Mount Tremper, elevation

Notable landmarks
The Catskill Mountain House, built in 1824, was a hotel near Palenville, New York, in the Catskill Mountains overlooking the Hudson River Valley. In its prime at the turn of the century, visitors included United States Presidents Ulysses S. Grant, Chester A. Arthur and Theodore Roosevelt.

Transportation
From 1872, the northern part of the Catskills were served by the Catskill Mountain Branch of the Ulster and Delaware Railroad which was absorbed into the New York Central railroad in 1932. Oneonta to Kingston passenger rail service continued until 1954. Part of the line still exists but now serves only freight. 

The southern part of the Catskills was served by the New York, Ontario and Western Railway. Over the course of 1950, service on the NYO&W downscaled to summer only. In its last years it ran trains from Roscoe to Weehawken, New Jersey, via Liberty. It connected with the New York Central's West Shore Railroad at Cornwall. This service lasted until September 10, 1953. 

The Delaware and Ulster Railroad is a heritage railroad, based in Arkville, New York, that still runs a scenic part of the track from Highmount to Hubbell Corners, New York, for tourist use. The Catskill Mountain Railroad is also a heritage railroad in the Catskills, operating from Kingston up to Highmount.

The Catskills are accessible by automobile from the east along Interstate 87/New York State Thruway, which runs north–south through the Hudson Valley.  To the south and southwest, the Catskills are accessible by a variety of highways, including New York State Route 55, U.S. Route 44, U.S. Route 209, and New York State Route 17.  Access to the western Catskills is provided by New York State Route 30; and the vaguely defined far-western edge of the region is variously considered to be New York State Route 10 or Interstate 88, though this boundary remains a matter of local preference.  New York State Routes 28 and 23A cut east–west through the heart of the Catskills, serving many of the most popular outdoor tourist destinations.  New York State Route 23 runs east–west across the Catskills' northern section.

The closest major airports to the Catskill region are Albany International Airport to the north and Stewart International Airport in Newburgh to the south.  Smaller airports in the region include:
 Columbia County Airport in Hudson
 Dutchess County Airport in Poughkeepsie
 Joseph Y. Resnick Airport in Ellenville
 Kingston–Ulster Airport
 Kobelt Airport in Wallkill
 Randall Airport in Middletown
 Sullivan County International Airport in Monticello
 Wurtsboro–Sullivan County Airport

In popular culture

The Hudson Valley Film Commission maintains a list of films set in the Hudson Valley/Catskills Region. Of them, more than three dozen films are set in the Catskills. 
Author/illustrator Jonathan Schork, born and raised in Olivebridge in the southern Catskills, acknowledges the area as the inspiration for two of his children's books: 2016's The Love of Simon Fox, and 2018's More Tales from the Enchanted Wood (the latter the recipient of several prizes for children's literature).   
The town of Bethel, New York, located in the Catskills, was home to the famous Woodstock music festival that took place August 15–18, 1969. The event, wherein 32 music acts performed in front of over 500,000 concert-goers, was captured in the documentary movie Woodstock (1970). The site is now home to the world-renowned Bethel Woods Center for the Arts.

The many hotels and vacation resorts located in the Catskills are notable in American cultural history for their role in the development of modern stand-up comedy. Comedians such as Rodney Dangerfield, Jackie Mason, Alan King, and Don Rickles all got their start performing in Catskill hotel venues colloquially referred to as the Borscht Belt.

See also 
 Helderberg Escarpment
 Resorts World Catskills

References

Further reading

External links 

Hiking Guide to Catskill High Peaks—Catskill 3500 Club
List of Catskills peaks organized by hiking difficulty
Website for the Catskill Mountain Club hiking
The Catskill Archive – History of the Catskill Mountains
The Catskill Mountain Foundation
The Catskill Center
The Catskill Watershed Corporation
Catskill Region Photo Gallery
Catskill Mountainkeeper—Protecting the Six Counties of the Catskills
Catskill Mountain Businesses listed on Hudson Valley Directory
Sullivan County Visitors Association

 
Allegheny Plateau
Landforms of Delaware County, New York
Landforms of Greene County, New York
Landforms of Schoharie County, New York
Landforms of Sullivan County, New York
Landforms of Ulster County, New York
Mountain ranges of New York (state)
Physiographic regions of the United States
Regions of New York (state)
Subranges of the Appalachian Mountains
Tourist attractions in New York (state)
Upstate New York